Kapil Dev is a former Test and One Day International (ODI) cricketer who represented India between 1978 and 1994. He took 24 five-wicket hauls during his international career. In cricket, a five-wicket haul—also known as a five-for or fifer—refers to a bowler taking five or more wickets in a single innings. This is regarded as a notable achievement, and fewer than 40 bowlers have taken more than 15 five-wicket hauls at international level in their cricketing careers. A right-arm fast bowler, Kapil Dev took 434 wickets in Test cricket and 253 in ODIs. With 23 five-wicket hauls in Tests, he has the third highest number of international five-wicket hauls among Indian cricketers as of 2012, after Anil Kumble and Harbhajan Singh. Kapil Dev was named by the Wisden as one of their Cricketers of the Year in 1983 and Indian Cricketer of the Century in 2002. Eight years later, the International Cricket Council (ICC) inducted him into the ICC Cricket Hall of Fame. As of 2012, Kapil Dev also holds the record for being the only player to have taken more than 400 wickets and scored over 5,000 runs in Tests.

Kapil Dev made his Test and ODI debuts against Pakistan, both in 1978. His first five-wicket haul came a year later against England during the first Test of India's tour. His career-best bowling figures in an innings of nine for 83 was achieved in 1983 against the West Indies in Ahmedabad. In Tests, Kapil Dev was most successful against Pakistan and Australia, with seven five-wicket hauls against each of them. He took his only five-wicket haul in ODIs against Australia during the 1983 Cricket World Cup.

After playing for nearly 16 years, Kapil Dev retired from international cricket in 1994. At the time of his retirement, he held the world record for the most wickets taken in Test and ODI cricket; both records were subsequently broken by Courtney Walsh and Wasim Akram respectively. His combined tally of 24 five-wicket hauls is eleventh in the all-time list in 2012, a record jointly held with Sydney Barnes, Imran Khan and Dennis Lillee.

Key

Tests

ODIs

Notes

References

Indian cricket lists
Dev, Kapil